Thee Wall Street Crash most often refers to the Wall Street Crash of 1929.

Wall Street Crash may also refer to:

 Wall Street Crash of 1987, also known as Black Monday (1987)
 Wall Street Crash of 2008, part of the 2007–2008 financial crisis
 2020 stock market crash, also known as Black Monday (2020)
 Wall Street Crash (group), an English vocal group